Australian Seal is an outdoor sculpture of 1968–69 by Thomas Bass, installed outside the Embassy of Australia, Washington, D.C., in the United States. The bronze sculpture measures approximately  x  x  and is set on a flagstone base. It depicts a kangaroo, emu, and the Australian shield, which includes images of St. George's Cross, Queen Victoria's crown, a Maltese Cross, magpie, black swan, and lions. Above the shield is a seven-pointed star.

See also
 1969 in art
 List of public art in Washington, D.C., Ward 2

References

1969 establishments in Washington, D.C.
1969 sculptures
Sculptures of birds in the United States
Bronze sculptures in Washington, D.C.
Embassy Row
Mammals in art
Outdoor sculptures in Washington, D.C.
Sculptures of lions